Chicago III is the third studio album by the American rock band Chicago. It was released on January 11, 1971 through Columbia Records. The album was produced by James William Guercio and was the band's third consecutive double album in less than two years.

Much like the previous year's Chicago (many times referred to as Chicago II), Chicago III is made up of both multi-part suites and more conventional individual songs. The album saw the band integrate a number of different genres including folk and country ("What Else Can I Say", "Flight 602"), free improvisation ("Free Country"), and musique concrète ("Progress?") into their sound, while also continuing in their trademark jazz-rock style.

Chicago III was a critical and commercial success. It peaked at number two in the US, their highest chart placement at that point, and received positive reviews. While neither of its singles ("Free" and "Lowdown") matched the success of the band's previous and following singles, both managed to make the top 40, peaking at numbers 20 and 35, respectively. After the release of the album, Chicago would become the first rock band to play the famous Carnegie Hall; performances from this run would be released on the following album Live at Carnegie Hall.

Background 
In the wake of the enormous worldwide success of their second album, Chicago spent almost all of 1970 on the road, an exhausting undertaking.  Former drummer Danny Seraphine, described the members of the band as "fatigued and road-weary" when they went into the studio to record the album.

Released in January 1971, initially on Columbia Records, Chicago III — the band's first album to sport a Roman numeral in its title — sold well upon its release and was certified gold by the Recording Industry Association of America (RIAA) a month later.  It provided Chicago with its highest charting disc yet in the US, going to No. 2 on the Billboard 200.  "Free", written by Robert Lamm, made it into the top 20 of the Billboard Hot 100 chart, and "Lowdown", co-written by Peter Cetera and Danny Seraphine, reached the top 40. Chicago III marked a dwindling in UK fortunes in comparison to the band's first two albums, Chicago Transit Authority and Chicago, reaching No. 9 in a brief chart run.

In 1974, jazz bandleader Stan Kenton added a suite of songs from the album ("Canon", "Mother", "Once Upon a Time" and "Free") to his band's repertoire, releasing it on the album Stan Kenton Plays Chicago.

Musical style, writing, composition 
The band had used up its storehouse of original material on its first two albums. It needed new material for Chicago III, and the songwriters worked "nonstop" Danny Seraphine said the band "took the opportunity to experiment with instrumentals and showcase our skills as musicians."

Their long hours on the road gave the principal songwriters, Robert Lamm, Terry Kath and James Pankow, much food for thought, resulting in more serious subject matter, which contrasted with the positivity of their first two sets. In his retrospective review of the album, Jeff Giles writes that Lamm's  "Travel Suite" was "inspired by the boredom, loneliness, and beauty of the road," and characterizes Pankow's "Elegy" suite is an "ecologically minded composition", (an issue Lamm also touches upon in "Mother"). While Kath's multi-part "An Hour in the Shower" provides a reprieve from the sobering explorations elsewhere, Chicago III was undeniably the result of a band who had seen the flip side of the world over the last several months. "Lowdown", co-written by Peter Cetera and Danny Seraphine, was Seraphine's first co-writing credit, and he was appreciative of the support Cetera gave him during the writing process.

Chicago III  incorporates a variety of musical styles. "Sing a Mean Tune Kid" features the influence of funk, "What Else Can I Say" and "Flight 602" have a country feel, while abstract qualities are found in "Free Country" and "Progress?"

Recording and production 
The album was produced by James William Guercio, who was Chicago's producer for its first eleven albums. This album was mixed and released in both stereo and quadraphonic. In 2002, Chicago III was remastered and reissued on one CD by Rhino Records.

Artwork and packaging 
The album cover design is titled "Tattered Flag" on the band's web site. Included with the album was a poster of the band dressed in the uniforms of America's wars, standing in front of a field of crosses, representing those who had died in the still ongoing Vietnam War. It also gave the number of casualties from each war up until the time of the album's release.

Track listing

Personnel

Chicago 
 Peter Cetera – bass, lead and backing vocals
 Terry Kath – guitars, lead and backing vocals
 Robert Lamm – keyboards, lead and backing vocals, spoken word on "When All the Laughter Dies in Sorrow".
 Lee Loughnane – trumpet
 James Pankow – trombone
 Walter Parazaider – saxophone, flute
 Danny Seraphine – drums, percussion

Production 
 Producer – James William Guercio
 Engineering – Don Puluse and Sy Mitchell
 Recording – Lou Waxman and Willie Greer
 Logo design – Nick Fasciano
 Album design – John Berg
 Flag design – Natalie Williams
 Photography – Sandy Speiser
 Poster photo – Steve Horn and Norm Griner
 Lettering – Annette Kawecki and Melanie Marder for Poseidon Productions

Charts
Chicago III (Columbia 30110) reached No. 2 on the Billboard 200 in the US during a chart stay of 63 weeks.

References

Chicago (band) albums
1971 albums
Albums produced by James William Guercio
Columbia Records albums
Albums recorded at CBS 30th Street Studio